Lars Bender (born 27 April 1989) is a German former professional footballer who played as a right back and defensive midfielder. He is the twin brother of Sven Bender.

Club career

Early career
Lars Bender played from 1993 to 1999 in the youth of the TSV Brannenburg, from 1999 to 2002 he was part of SpVgg Unterhaching youth teams. In summer 2002, he moved to the 1860 München youth team.

1860 Munich
In August 2006, Bender played his first game for 1860 Munich II in the Regionalliga Süd. In October, he was an unused substitute in the 1860 Munich senior team, and on 27 November 2006, when he was 17 years old, he made his professional debut at the home game against the TuS Koblenz in the 2. Bundesliga. In his first professional season, he played 13 matches, nine of them in the starting lineup. In this season, Bender won the Fritz-Walter trophy, ahead of then Mönchengladbach's Marko Marin and his twin brother, Sven Bender. In his second season, he was a regular player in the defensive midfield. On the first day of the new season, he scored his first goal. Bender started 2008–09 season again as a regular player. In the second league game against FSV Frankfurt on 3 October 2008, he took over the captaincy and was at 19 the youngest captain in the history of the 1860 Munich, but on 20 October he was seriously injured and after a number of injuries, he finished that season with only 15 matches played. In his three professional seasons played for 1860 München in the 2. Bundesliga, he played 58 games and scored four goals.

Bayer 04 Leverkusen
On 18 August 2009, Bender signed a three-year contract with Bayer Leverkusen. He played his first match in the Bundesliga coming off the bench on Matchday 6 and was used as a substitute in most of 20 games he played during his first season in Bayer Leverkusen. He scored his first goal in the Bundesliga against Eintracht Frankfurt on 16 September, an eventual 4–0 win. In the following season, his position in the defensive midfield remained competitive and he was often second choice, but he played 27 matches and scored three goals. In the 2011–12 season, he was a regular player and played most of the games over the full season, only interrupted by a forced break for a muscle bundle crack injury in the spring of 2012. On 21 March 2012, Bender signed a new contract with Leverkusen to 2018. In the 2012–13 Bundesliga season, he played 33 games, scored 3 goals and made 6 assists. On 31 October 2013, he extended his contract with Leverkusen until 2019. 

In the 2013–14 season, he played 29 games and scored three goals in the Bundesliga, despite being injured for the most of September and October and again in the spring of 2014. In the 2014–2015 season, he returned to the field and played 26 games in Bundesliga, scoring one goal against SC Paderborn 07. In UEFA Champions League he helped Leverkusen finish runner-up in the group stage behind AS Monaco but later lost to Atlético Madrid in the Round of 16. For season 2015/16 coach Roger Schmidt appointed him as the new team captain in place of Simon Rolfes, who had ended his career after the end of the preseason. This season is a struggle for him, after had long time injury in October 2015 until March 2016, and he's only got 10 appearances in Bundesliga and made a pair appearances in Champions League. Bender abdicated the captaincy prior to the 2020–21 season due to his ongoing injury issues, passing the role over to Charles Aránguiz. Both Benders jointly announced that they would retire from football at the end of the 2020–21 season.

Bender played his final professional match on 22 May 2021, the final matchday of the 2020–21 Bundesliga, in which Leverkusen played against Borussia Dortmund. It was his 256th top-flight match for Leverkusen. He replaced his brother Sven, who had also played his final match, in the 89th minute while Leverkusen was awarded a penalty. Lars Bender took the penalty, and in a respectful gesture, Dortmund goalkeeper Roman Bürki allowed him to score without making any effort to save the shot. Bender's final goal of his professional career was a mere consolation goal as Leverkusen went on to lose the match 3–1.

International career

He was part of the German under-19 side that won the 2008 UEFA European Under-19 Football Championship. He and his twin Sven were named jointly as players of the tournament.

Bender was chosen as part of Germany's 23-man squad for Euro 2012. He scored an 80th-minute winner in the final group game against Denmark.

On 29 May 2013, Bender scored twice in a 4–2 win over Ecuador.

He was named in Germany's provisional 30-man squad for the 2014 FIFA World Cup, but withdrew on 23 May following a thigh injury in training. Manager Joachim Löw said, "I feel personally very sorry for Lars because I know how much he wanted to be in Brazil, when a player is ruled out so close before a tournament then it is very disappointing for everyone". He played his last internationals for Germany in late 2014.

Lars was part of the Germany Olympic football team for Rio along with his twin and Nils Petersen who were the three selected over 23 years old players, winning the silver medal.

Style of play
Bender normally played as a defensive midfielder or right-back. He is known for his all-action style and possesses good tackling, passing and ball interception.

Coaching career
In June 2022, the German Football Association appointed him as the new assistant coach of the German U-15 national team.

Career statistics

Club

International goals
Scores and results list Germany's goal tally first.

Honours
Germany Youth 
UEFA European Under-19 Championship: 2008
Summer Olympic Games: Silver Medal, 2016
Individual
Fritz Walter Medal U17 Gold Medal 2006
UEFA European Under-19 Football Championship Golden Player: 2008

References

External links

 
 
 
 
 
 
 Kicker profile 
 Bundesliga profile
 
 
 

1989 births
Living people
German twins
People from Rosenheim
Sportspeople from Upper Bavaria
Footballers from Bavaria
Association football midfielders
German footballers
Germany international footballers
Germany under-21 international footballers
Germany youth international footballers
Bundesliga players
2. Bundesliga players
TSV 1860 Munich II players
TSV 1860 Munich players
Bayer 04 Leverkusen players
Bayer 04 Leverkusen II players
Twin sportspeople
UEFA Euro 2012 players
Footballers at the 2016 Summer Olympics
Olympic footballers of Germany
Medalists at the 2016 Summer Olympics
Olympic silver medalists for Germany
Olympic medalists in football